The discography of American singer-songwriter and pianist Fiona Apple consists of five studio albums, one compilation album, 2 video albums, 16 singles and 17 music videos.

In 1994, Apple signed a record deal with The Work Group and Columbia Records, and began recording material for her debut album Tidal. The album contained elements of alternative rock, baroque pop and jazz. It became a commercial success, being certified three-times platinum by the Recording Industry Association of America (RIAA). It established Apple's presence in the music industry. The album produced the Grammy Award-winning controversial single "Criminal". In 1998, The Work Group was absorbed by Epic Records, which then released Apple's second album simply known as When the Pawn... in 1999. The album's full title currently holds the record for the third longest album title. It was certified platinum by the RIAA. In 2002, Apple began recording for her third studio album, Extraordinary Machine, which was delayed for more than three years, eventually being bootlegged in 2004. Extraordinary Machine featured an art pop-oriented sound and was finally released in 2005. Like its predecessor, it was also certified gold by the RIAA. In 2008, Apple went on a hiatus while secretly recording new material for her fourth studio album, The Idler Wheel.... The album was released in 2012, seven years after the release of Extraordinary Machine. Almost eight years passed until the release of her fifth studio album in 2020, Fetch the Bolt Cutters.

Albums

Studio albums

Compilation albums

Collaboration albums

Singles

Other charted songs

Other appearances

Music videos

Notes

References

External links
Official website
Fiona Apple at AllMusic

Alternative rock discographies
Pop music discographies
Discographies of American artists
Discography